The Forsyte Saga is a British drama television serial that chronicles the lives of three generations of an upper-middle-class family from the 1870s to 1920s. It was based on the books of John Galsworthy's trilogy The Forsyte Saga, which were adapted by Granada Television for the ITV network in 2002 (Series I) and 2003 (Series II). Additional funding was provided by American PBS station WGBH, as the 1967 BBC version had been a success on PBS in the early 1970s.

Development 

The author Malcolm Bradbury wrote that the prospect of the new series "brings a tear to the eye and a smile to the lips"; a tear because time had passed the culturally-significant original by, but smile because investment in a classic project is good.

The makers of the 2002 version felt that any new production would be compared with the 1967 version, which set the standards for period drama for the next 25 years. The idea came initially from David Liddiment, ITV's director of channels, who seized on the Forsyte novels not only as a great achievement in English literature, but also for their iconic status in British television. Granada were thinking big from the outset of the project – this was clearly something that couldn't be dashed off as a two-parter. The initial plan was for two series, the first an adaptation of The Forsyte Saga and the second continuing with A Modern Comedy.

Sita Williams attached herself to the project in late 1999 and by the start of 2000 was talking to writers and working on the adaptations. Casting began in 2001, first casting the leading roles of Soames, Irene and Bosinney (Williams had seen Damian Lewis in Band of Brothers).

Cast

Episode plots for first series 
This plot summary covers in eight sections the six episodes of the first series only. Series One portrays the first two books and the first interlude of John Galsworthy's trilogy The Forsyte Saga.

One 
It is 1874. The Forsytes gather to celebrate Winifred Forsyte's (Amanda Root) engagement to Montague Dartie, a penniless but charming man. Her cousin Young Jolyon (Rupert Graves) is absent from the party. We find he is at home with his daughter, June, and her French governess, Hélène. Jolyon and Hélène are involved in a minor flirtation, but their true feelings for each other are realized when his wife, Frances, falsely accuses him of an indiscretion and Jolyon is ordered to dismiss the governess. They acknowledge their feelings for each other only after this accusation, and he then decides to leave Frances. Young Jolyon finds himself cut off from the Forsyte fortune and family.

Nine years later, Young Jolyon has a son with Hélène and a daughter on the way. He tries to claim some of the capital of his inheritance from his grandfather Forsyte, rather than just existing on his allowance, so he and Hélène can purchase a larger house. His uncle James, the only remaining trustee, is heavily influenced by James' son Soames (Damian Lewis) and refuses him.

A prosperous partner in the family law firm, Soames becomes interested in the beautiful but poor Irene Heron (Gina McKee) while on business in the seaside town of Bournemouth, where she lives with her widowed stepmother. Though at first, with youthful enthusiasm, she considers his advances flattering, he ultimately does not appeal to her because of his awkward manner and desire to own things. For example, while at an art gallery, she sees the beauty of a painting, but he sees it as a possession, something to be owned and hung in his hallway. When he proposes, she refuses him despite encouragement from her stepmother because of their impoverished state as a result of Irene's father's death, leaving them only £50 a year to live on. She and her stepmother are invited to visit his family, and she behaves contrary to social expectations when she dances with Winifred when she is supposed to be in mourning. Intrigued by her beauty and danger, Soames forgoes the rules and asks her to dance.

Some months later, Winifred gives birth to a child, Imogen. Montague ("Monty") gives her a string of pearls as a gift. She wonders how he could have afforded them considering that her father did not settle money or a house on Winifred when they married, and Monty is not a wealthy man. At a dance in Bournemouth, Soames attempts to show his continued passion for Irene, but ends up vulgarly kissing her arm in public. She is mortified, and her stepmother is disappointed when Irene refuses him again.

Two 
Under pressure from her stepmother, Irene accepts Soames' proposal under the condition that if she should not be happy, he should let her go. They share an awkward, rigid kiss in the street.

Young Jolyon and Hélène are now living in a modest house in St John's Wood with their two small children and read in the paper that his wife, Frances, has died. He proposes to Hélène and she happily accepts.

Two years later, Irene is trapped in a loveless marriage. Soames is obsessed with his seemingly perfect wife. She secretly takes steps to avoid getting pregnant as the idea of having his child is despicable to her. She finds friendship in Young Jolyon's abandoned daughter, June (Gillian Kearney), who has been raised by her grandfather, Old Jolyon (Corin Redgrave). The 17-year-old June is engaged to a 26-year-old, penniless architect, Philip Bosinney (Ioan Gruffudd). Old Jolyon, who has become like a father to June, will not allow her to marry until Bosinney earns £400 a year.

Unbeknown to June and Soames, Bosinney and Irene are instantly attracted to each other. Irene asks that she have her own bedroom under the guise of not being able to sleep well. Soames is not keen on the idea, but she moves out of the room anyway. Hearing of her unhappy life through the gossiping June, Bosinney is further drawn toward Irene. Simultaneously, he grows cold toward June.

Soames does not like June's influence over his wife and aims to take Irene away from the city. He hopes that she might then concentrate on being a better wife toward him and to produce the heir so desperately wanted by himself and, more importantly, his father. He hires Bosinney to build a house at Robin Hill near Richmond and employs Bosinney as the architect (in the series the house is modelled visibly after Frank Lloyd Wright's Robie House). The income will allow Bosinney to earn £350, not quite enough to allow a marriage but enough for Old Jolyon to allow an engagement between Bosinney and June. Robin Hill will serve as Irene's countryside prison. Meanwhile, Old Jolyon realising that June will soon be lost to him as a companion wishes to renew his relationship with Young Jolyon. He pays his son and Hélène a visit.

Meanwhile, the Darties seem to be living a luxurious and happy life. (They now have another child, a son, Val.) Unbeknown to Winifred, Dartie frequently squanders her money on gambling and failed business ventures. She catches him eyeing the pearls he once gave her. Some time later, bailiffs come to their house and repossess items to fulfill Dartie's debt of 100 guineas. Her father, James Forsyte, is thoroughly embarrassed by the situation, especially as their house is rented in his name.

Soames and Irene discuss the country house. She does not wish to live there, but he insists that she would be happy there eventually, especially when they have children. When she walks away, upset with the idea of children, he waits for her in her bedroom. He persuades her to come back to his bedroom, though she does so reluctantly.

Old Jolyon, obviously missing company since June's engagement to Bosinney, seeks out his son at his club. They return to Old Jolyon's house and, while sharing a drink, he tries to make up for their estrangement by handing Young Jolyon a cheque for £10,000. Jolyon does not accept it but asks him to invest it for his children.

Bosinney and June are planning their wedding, although he appears to be less enthusiastic about it than she. He goes to Soames's house to discuss Robin Hill, but finds Irene in the drawing room before Soames has come downstairs. They share a kiss. Bosinney and Soames discuss the plans for the house, which is very modern. When Irene shows interest in the architectural style being, as she puts it, with a sense of 'beauty and proportion,' her husband agrees to fund the project for £500 more than he first agreed to spend. Soames congratulates himself for having found such an innovative architect for the job.

Old Jolyon finds his son living a bohemian lifestyle with his wife and two children, Jolly (who is also named Jolyon) and Holly. Hélène is suspicious of her father-in-law's sudden interest in their lives, and thanks God for her husband's source of income, his paintings. Young Jolyon tells her that he has discovered that his father has secretly been buying his watercolors as a way of supporting him through the years. Old Jolyon expresses his loneliness to his son.

Three 
June grows afraid that her wedding will never take place as Bosinney seems always to be working on Robin Hill. She becomes angry at Irene's platitude that the hard times will pass, calls her old friend trite, and leaves in a huff. At Robin Hill, the building continues, but there are misunderstandings in budgeting, as he has gone over the agreed price by £700+. However, Soames relents because he wants the work done. Meanwhile, Irene and Bosinney's flirtations become more and more dangerous and they have a number of close calls. Irene takes a buggy ride with Soames' Uncle Swithin and suggests that they drive to Robin Hill, obviously in the hope of meeting with Bosinney. Later, pretending to be asleep on the patio, Swithin sees the two lovers heading into the woods where Bosinney confesses his love for Irene and the two share a passionate embrace.

Rumours begin about Irene and Bosinney and Old Jolyon asks his son to speak with June's fiancé, in an attempt to convince Bosinney to be faithful to June. He refuses because he feels it would be hypocritical, considering his past. Meanwhile, Soames' mother has a talk with Irene. She suggests that perhaps things would be better once they have children. Irene confesses to her, "I do not love him. I cannot love him. I don't want to love him." In the midst of his growing love for Irene, Bosinney snubs June in the street, driving her into a fit of depression.

The entire Forsyte family is alerted of Irene and Bosinney's affair with the exception of Soames and June. However, during a ball, they are caught talking outside by Monty Dartie and later flaunt their love for each other by dancing passionately in front of the entire family. June runs off in tears, her grandfather running after her. Irene asks Soames to let her go, but he refuses. He threatens to beat her, but then immediately apologizes. When they get home she runs into her room and locks the door to an enraged Soames. Determined to ruin Bosinney for stealing his wife's love, he sues Bosinney for breach of contract for increasing their agreed price for Robin Hill by another £350. While visiting the aunts, Monty gossips and spreads the news of Irene's indiscretion.

Irene and Bosinney consummate their relationship and have confidence that they can be together after the trial. However, as the court case nears, he is unable to secure future clients. Without work, he will be bankrupt at the end of the trial. She offers him her father's watch to fund his legal costs telling him that the watch might be for sale, but her father's memory is not.

Four 
When Irene stays at Bosinney's for longer than she intended, Soames grows suspicious. June returns from a holiday in Switzerland and discovers the lawsuit. Despite his infidelity, she still supports him against Soames. Walking in the park, Irene and Bosinney run into Young Jolyon Forsyte painting a watercolor. She lies about why they are together, though Jolyon knows the truth.

Old Jolyon goes to his brother James to withdraw his will and place it with another solicitor. He then goes to his son's house and expresses his desire to "be a family again." He expects them to feel relief and gratitude at the offer, but he is told that one could be happy despite poverty. Hélène and Jolyon discuss if they should take his offer.

Irene asks for a divorce, but Soames refuses. She is late once again coming home from Bosinney's dwelling. Later that night, Soames comes into Irene's room unannounced and rapes her. The maid hears her screaming, but can do nothing. Irene meets with Bosinney the next day and he discovers the truth. In a rage, Bosinney goes to confront Soames, but as he runs through the foggy streets, he is run over by a cab and killed.

When Bosinney does not appear at his own court hearing (which he loses anyway) and he does not meet Irene at a hotel (to run away together), June and Irene go to his apartment. They have words against each other where Irene compares June to Soames, and June calls Irene a leech. Finally, Irene slaps June to stop her tirade. Old Jolyon asks June what she would think of living with her father and his family. She suggests living at Robin Hill.

When Soames comes home from court, the maid tells him Irene has left with two suitcases. Old Jolyon goes to Soames and asks to buy Robin Hill from him. However, they are interrupted when a policeman asks Soames to identify Bosinney's body. Old Jolyon has to break the terrible news to June. Last to learn is Irene, who has gone to Bosinney's club in search of him. Jolyon, also a member there, breaks the news to her. Irene is obviously devastated, and Young Jolyon offers to have her stay with his family rather than return to Soames but Irene refuses, not wishing to upset June any further. He reluctantly takes her back to Soames. He is haunted by the expression on her face and regrets delivering her to Soames. Soames tries to convince her that Bosinney's death was a sign that they should be together. She goes up to her room in shock.

Five 
The next day, Irene leaves again, this time for good, but with only the clothes on her back. She leaves her wedding ring behind. Young Jolyon meets the male members of his family again at the club, but he and his father are repulsed by Dartie's talk of Irene's situation. In the meantime, Soames is deluded into thinking that she will return, asking his housekeeper Bilson to continue changing the flowers in her room.

June and her father reunite, but he feels like it is not his place to console her when she cries to her grandfather about Bosinney's funeral arrangements. The father and daughter embark on a newfound friendship, discussing Bosinney and her half-siblings. During the funeral, June berates Soames for his part in her fiancé's death. Despite her falling out with Irene, she still defends her in the context of her marriage to him. She also reveals that she knew that Irene prevented the conception of any of his children. He retorts that their friendship was a sham, and she replies, "Yes she stole the love of my life, my future. I should hate her, but the alternative was you. I cannot hate her. I can only wonder why she didn't do it sooner."

Soames' mother comes to visit her despondent son, who has taken to his bed. In the presence of his sister Winifred, he cannot speak, only cry over Irene. His mother is affectionate toward him, but she wonders if she raised a child incapable of loving another being. She mentions that when he was a boy she gave him a kitten which he smothered with his love. "I should have taught you not to love like that ... You feel things too much, you always have." Soames finally gets up the next morning and appears to be fully recovered. He tells Bilson not to bother cleaning Mrs. Forsyte's room. He begins to move on with his life.

Old Jolyon makes an offer on Robin Hill. He defends Irene to Soames' parents. "If you talk about Irene, you do so with respect. Your son loved her once, with very good cause." The brothers settle that Jolyon will pay full price for the house. June gets along well with her father's family as they unpack their belongings at Robin Hill. She discovers a bundle of paintings of her father's; among them is a painting of her father she did as a child. The family toasts to "new beginnings."

Five years have passed and Hélène has died. Old Jolyon is once again taking care of a granddaughter, this time young Holly, while the rest of the family is traveling abroad. One evening, Old Jolyon notices Irene at the opera, and a few days later on the grounds of Robin Hill. They renew their acquaintance and he invites her to give young Holly piano lessons. Irene reveals that on the night she left Soames she was on the brink of disaster when a "lady of the night" took her in and cared for her. She has since made a living teaching piano while giving what food and comfort she could to other such women. With June and Young Jolyon abroad, Irene and Old Jolyon see each other often. He and Irene grow close, and in his own way he falls in love with her. However, his health soon fails and he dies shortly after.

Six 
Jolyon and June return home and discover that Irene had visited before their arrival. Young Jolyon is the executor of his father's will. To the shock of the Forsytes, Old Jolyon had made a codicil to his will that leaves Irene £15,000. The whole Forsyte clan attend the funeral at Robin Hill and there is gossip and speculation as to why he would bequeath money to Irene and some astonishment that he would be buried outside the family crypt. Jolyon and June discuss what has come to pass and she states that all the people she ever loved "all gravitate to her [Irene] in the end."

Being the executor, Jolyon visits Irene to discuss the money his father left her. He becomes her trustee, and during that time, he finds himself admiring her. She comforts him as he cries about his father's death.

Twelve years pass and everyone gathers for Soames' surprise 50th birthday party, with the exception of Jolyon's family. Winifred's children Val and Imogen are grown. Though still married to Irene, Soames has met a beautiful young French woman, Annette Lamotte. She is the waitress in a restaurant that Soames owns. Her mother is the manager. He invites them to visit his new country estate, Mapledurham. He shows off his art gallery, a collection of beautiful paintings which he seeks to own, but does not understand.

In the meanwhile, Dartie and his cousin-in-law George spend their time gambling and cavorting with prostitutes. He has given Winifred's pearl necklace to one of them. He embarrasses his son, Val, at the casino by stumbling about and falling down drunk. Dartie comes home after his son runs off, and his wife says that her pearls are missing. At her accusation, he reacts frantically and puts a gun to his head shouting, "I'm lower than the servants in this house and I'm tired of it." However, when he pulls the trigger he finds that it was not loaded. He admits that he gave her necklace away. "I gave them to a Spanish beauty, neck like a swan." After spending the night on the sofa, and in the haze of the following morning Monty decides to leave his family and go to Buenos Aires. Soames tries to convince Winifred to begin divorce proceedings, and he expresses his desire to "start again" as well. Winifred states that she would not like a divorce, which would humiliate her and her children. Soames visits his ill father who tells him to have a son.

Jolyon is preparing for an exhibition of his watercolors at Robin Hill. Soames comes to visit, along with Val, asking if Jolyon knew if Irene "had any men" as grounds for divorce. Jolyon agrees to see her if and when she returns to London. Jolyon goes to her flat and asks her if she could provide what Soames needs for a divorce, but she admits there has been no one since Bosinney; Soames should have taken his chance then, but now she cannot help him.

In the meantime, Val and Holly are forming an attachment and falling in love. They are unaware of the Forsyte history.

Jolyon visits Soames and tells him there is nothing he can do to facilitate a divorce.

Soames: If Irene won't free the ties of our marriage, she must abide by its duties. I retain my rights.
Jolyon: Your rights? To do what?
Soames: I've not forgotten the nickname your father gave me. "The Man of Property!" I'm not called names for nothing.
Jolyon: She is a human being.
Soames: She is my wife. Irene ... Forsyte. I'll thank you to leave her alone from now on.
Jolyon: She chooses Heron.
Soames: Do you hear me? Leave Mrs. Forsyte alone.
Jolyon: Think very carefully Soames before you try to bully her. She's not alone this time.

While he forces Winifred's hand in her own divorce, once Soames believes that he must be with Irene, he does not follow his own advice to divorce and move on.

Seven 
Despite his feelings for Annette, Soames' feelings for Irene are easily rekindled. His obsession with her returns when he sees her again, even after 12 years. He pays her an unexpected visit and wants to resume his marriage to her since she won't grant a divorce. He follows her and asks her to bear him a son. A group of "women of the night" save her from him, and she escapes. She consults with Young Jolyon, and they conclude that he will not rest until she grants him a divorce or gives him an heir. Irene visits Robin Hill and reveals to Jolyon that Soames had once forced himself on her. She quickly leaves for Paris to escape Soames' harassment. During their talk, Jolly overheard his father shout, "Damn Soames Forsyte!" Discovering his sister's romance with Val Dartie, Jolly forbids that they see each other again, prejudiced by what he overheard his father say. He tries to blackmail her into giving Val up by threatening to tell their father of the relationship.

Winifred is humiliated in court, but quickly realizes that Soames had no intention of divorcing Irene. Soames hires a private detective to find and follow Irene, saying that he is representing a client called Heron (Irene is using her maiden name). Jolyon meets Irene in France to visit and bring her money he has collected as rent for her flat in Chelsea. There they spend time together and begin to fall in love.

Val and Holly are secretly engaged but are discovered by Jolly. Jolly forces Val to prove his love for Holly by going with him to enlist in the Boer War.

In the meantime, Dartie comes home to Winifred, having run out of money.

Eight 
Holly and June become nurses, and ship out to South Africa, where Jolly is ill with typhoid fever. Jolly dies, an event that hits Young Jolyon very hard. Soames discovers Irene and Young Jolyon together at Robin Hill just after they have learned of Jolly's death and accuses them of adultery. They are not yet lovers, but they know that without admitting guilt, Irene will never be free of Soames. Irene and Soames divorce while she and Jolyon go away together as a couple.

Val comes home from the war along with Holly. He has been discharged after a stray bullet hit his ankle. He announces to his family that he and Holly are married and that they are moving to South Africa. Soames and Annette go to her mother's restaurant and he sees Irene is pregnant with Jolyon's child.

Soon afterward, Soames and Annette are married and having a family party at Mapledurham at which Annette announces that she is pregnant. Soames relishes the prospect of producing an heir at last, as does his father who tells her, "A boy, you hear me? A boy." Meanwhile, George reads the paper aloud, which announces that Jolyon and Irene Forsyte have had a son, Jon. At Robin Hill, June and Irene are reconciled.

Annette has a difficult delivery, and the doctor tells Soames to choose between saving his wife or his baby; either way, she will never bear another child. Soames believes that Annette would be devastated by the loss of the child if she were to survive, and tells the doctor to do what he can to save the child at all costs. Annette survives and they have a baby girl. He is disappointed and leaves his wife's side and go to his father, who is dying. He lies to his father and says he has had a baby boy. Soames returns home in the morning. He falls in love with his daughter immediately. Holding her in his arms, he names her Fleur.

Episode plots for second series 
This plot summary covers the four episodes of the second series, which relate to Jon and Fleur in later life. Series Two was titled The Forsyte Saga: To Let and portrays the last book of The Forsyte Saga, To Let.

One 
Nine years have passed since the events of the first series. June Forsyte (Gillian Kearney ) takes her half brother Jon on an impromptu visit to her Aunt Hester's (Ann Bell). She discovers that it is Hester's birthday and a party is being held with other members of the Forsyte family, including Soames and his daughter Fleur. The children are encouraged to play outside, and playing by a pond Fleur soils her dress with mud. Soames shouts at Jon for encouraging bad behaviour. Back at Robin Hill, Irene Forsyte is angry when Jon talks about the "nasty man" that yelled at him, and is disappointed that June should have exposed him to that side of the family. She hopes that he will forget the encounter quickly.

Eleven years later in 1920, June is running a fashionable gallery in London and has a new exhibition. Soames and Fleur visit the gallery, not knowing it is June's, and encounter Irene and Jon there. Irene is instantly made ill at ease with the presence of Soames, but Jon and Fleur seem to be intrigued with one another, especially upon discovering that they are, as Soames puts it, "distant" cousins. Irene is disturbed by the meeting and tells her husband Jolyon that Jon appeared to be "entranced’ by Fleur. He tells her not to worry, that boys of his age are fickle, and that the interest will pass.

Fleur knows that Holly Dartie (Amanda Ryan) is Jon's half-sister (and that he is currently staying at Val (Julian Ovenden) and Holly's farm). At her 18th birthday party, she invites herself to stay with them in order to meet Jon again. At the farm, when Jon is introduced to Fleur, she pretends they have not met before. She sneaks off early one morning to find Jon, who is working at the nearby farm of Mr Maple. The two connect immediately, and both wonder what secrets in their family's past have created the feud between their families.  They agree to keep their friendship a secret. However, Holly is becoming aware that something is between them, and confides in her father Jolyon and stepmother Irene, who are worried.

Meanwhile, Soames has met returned serviceman Michael Mont (Oliver Milburn) at an art auction, where the two bid for a copy of a painting by Degas of a girl who Soames believes shares a resemblance with his daughter. Soames invites the young man to his home to see the rest of his art collection.

Montague Dartie (Ben Miles), his son Val, cousin George (Alistair Petrie) and Jon Forsyte meet with Prosper Profond (Michael Maloney), a wealthy French Armenian who shares their interest in horse racing. Prosper starts a seemingly harmless flirtation with Monty's wife Winifred (Amanda Root). One evening, Prosper claims to have to work and cancels an evening at the opera with Winifred. Later that evening however, Monty sees Prosper leaving the opera with Soames's wife Annette.

Jolyon Forsyte visits his doctor and is told that he has a weak heart and that he should not exert himself. Despite this, Jolyon confronts Soames, telling him to use his influence over his daughter to put an end to their children's friendship before it goes any further. Soames thinks Jolyon a hypocrite, considering that he has always taken pride in following his heart.

Two 
After a week Fleur and Jon leave Holly and Val's farm by train, and Jon becomes jealous when he sees Michael Mont collecting Fleur by boat to take her home to Mapledurham and Irene takes Jon on holiday to Paris in order to try to prevent his and Fleur's relationship from blossoming.

Soames and his wife, Annette (Beatriz Batarda), host a country weekend to encourage a match between Fleur and Michael; however, Fleur is pining for the loss of Jon and does not warm to Michael's advances.  While the guests are being farewelled, Fleur and her friend Cherry (Olivia Lumley) see Annette and Prosper in each other's arms in the garden and Fleur is outraged at her betrayal of Soames.

While Irene and Jon are away, missing Jon, Fleur goes to Robin Hill. Jolyon does not know her true identity and invites her in for lemonade and bemoans the fact that he is missing Irene and Jon. Jolyon tells June he is ill, and Irene and Jon return home, their attempt at having him forget about Fleur having failed. He is missing her more every day and, as soon as they arrive home, the pair reunite, Fleur confessing to Jon that she visited Robin Hill in his absence.

Fleur has discovered a photograph of Irene in a frame behind one of her mother and assumes that Jolyon stole Irene from Soames, and this is the reason for the family feud.

After his usual run of bad luck Monty Dartie gets onto a winning streak only to be killed in a car accident on his way home with his winnings.  At his funeral Prosper tells Fleur that her father and Jon's mother were in fact married and divorced.

Immediately after the funeral, Fleur goes to Robin Hill to tell Jon her discovery and is forced to have tea with Irene and Jolyon, who is obviously furious at having been deceived by her when his wife and son were abroad. After an argument with his parents, Jon leaves Robin Hill and heads to one of Farmer Maple's cottages.

Three 
Fleur arrives at the cottage and, though they sleep in separate beds, their love increases with Jon's estrangement from his family. While Jon is out working one day Jolyon arrives and implores Fleur to give up Jon, telling her he is ill and he needs Jon by his side more than ever.  She does not tell Jon of their conversation and, despite her assurances to Jolyon, she and Jon plan to elope to Scotland in three weeks time, where they do not need parental consent to marry.

An anonymous letter arrives at Mapledurham telling Soames of his wife's affair with Prosper; however she laughs it off as gossip and falsehood and continues her liaison. Soon after, however, Prosper advises that he has tired of England and is going abroad. Soames is pleased but sees how much it has hurt Annette and tries to comfort her as best he can.

Michael Mont asks Soames to become a formal suitor for Fleur's hand and, two weeks later, the pair are invited, along with Fleur's parents, to join Winifred in her tent at the Eton-Harrow cricket match.  While there, Soames is upset at the sight of Jolyon and Irene, obviously still very much in love, and Jon and Fleur manage a rendezvous that is seen by Jolyon. Prosper arrives at the cricket match and manages to woo back Annette, and Soames angrily resigns himself to the fact that he has an unfaithful wife for a second time.

After the cricket match Jolyon confesses to Irene that he is unwell, and they agree to tell Jon the truth about the past and Soames's obsession with his mother.  After this painful confession Jolyon suffers a massive heart attack and dies in the arms of his wife and son.

After his family have spread his ashes on the grave of Jolyon's father, Fleur, being stood up at the train station for their elopement, arrives at Robin Hill to see Jon. Grief-stricken and emotional, Jon gives in to temptation and he and Fleur make love. The couple are caught by June who berates Jon for being so stupid and unfeeling on that day of all days.

Four 
Fleur returns home and insists that nothing can prevent her and Jon from being together and convinces Soames to speak with Irene on her behalf.  The pair travel to Robin Hill but because of his parents' revelations about the past and also because he witnesses Soames's obsessive behaviour toward his mother; Jon turns Soames from the house and refuses to see Fleur who calls to Jon desperately from the garden.

Finally Jon and Irene go out to her and she accuses Irene of trying to keep Jon "all to herself" claiming "he's mine!" It is then that Jon realises that she is like her father, and thinks of people as being possessions.  Fleur, exhausted, reluctantly goes home with her father.

Fleur, like her father when Irene left him, takes to her bed and refuses to see her father whom she blames for her disappointment, but over time is again wooed by Michael Mont and, thinking all hope lost for her and Jon, eventually agrees to an engagement.

Prosper Profond visits Robin Hill with Holly to offer Jon some work and tells him of Fleur's romance with Michael. Jon is incensed that she should so quickly take up with someone else and Prosper facilitates a meeting between them. Jon tries to convince Fleur not to marry Michael, even though he cannot bring himself to hurt his family by being with her. She accuses him of being the one to treat her like a possession and says "If you won't have me then I'll do it my own way – and I'll forget about you Jon Forsyte – I swear I will!"

Fleur's feud with her father continues until the day of her wedding when Soames confesses to his abuse of Irene all those years ago and laments that every time they meet Irene thinks only of that moment.  Fleur softens toward him at this revelation, convinced that it is better to be in a loveless marriage than to be exposed to heartbreak as her father was with Irene, and Michael and Fleur marry.

Soames arrives at Robin Hill and there is a "to let" sign on the front gate.  He has come to give the Degas copy that resembles Fleur to Jon.  Both he and Irene question whether parting the young lovers was the right thing to do and admit that they miss the company of their children – Jon is abroad and Fleur on her honeymoon. They part with a handshake.  When Parfit, the butler, asks what the visitor wanted Irene responds with surprise "He didn't want anything."

Differences from the novels 
The broadcast serialisation of The Forsyte Saga and To Let differs from Galsworthy's novels chiefly in timing and in treatment of characters, principally in the pivotal character of Irene.

Timing

The timing of the events in the series and in the novels differs considerably. The novel begins in 1886 and the series begins in 1874. The writers of the series understood how difficult it would be to present the series in the order that events take place in the novel. Producer Sita Williams stated that, "The novels actually start with the engagement of June to Bosinney, in the middle of the story. You learn about Soames' wooing of Irene and about Young Jolyon's affair with the governess, Hélène, through the gossip and memories of the other characters. It's great for a novel, but not for TV. This isn't like adapting Dickens, who wrote perfect, straightforward, linear narratives. Galsworthy is more complicated than that. So we had to look at the back story and tease out the important things and put them on screen."

Irene

In the novels, the character of Irene is rather mysterious. She has no voice within the narrative and is described only by her effect on the characters around her. In the series, the character of Irene is far more complex and the viewer is able to form a more personal relationship with the character and more readily sympathise with her. In the novel, Irene is described more than once as having fair hair and dark eyes, this physical appearance being key to her particular brand of her attractiveness to nearly all the men in the novels. Actress Gina McKee, who portrayed Irene in the series, did not. This mattered little to director Christopher Menaul, who said, "The hardest part of casting was the search for Irene. She's an elusive character – even Galsworthy admitted that he'd drawn her in shadows, that she presented a different facade to every character in the book."

Forsyte siblings

The early novels put more emphasis on the older generations of Forsytes. All 10 of the older Forsyte siblings feature in the novels, which include several chapters devoted to Timothy (Afternoon at Timothy's, Timothy Prophecies) who shares his house on the Bayswater Road with his sisters Ann, Hester and Mrs. Small (Aunt Juley). Roger (George Forsyte's father) features in the novel, as do the other Forsyte siblings, Nicholas and Susan, none of whom appear in the television series. Much of the dialogue of the older generation and their Victorian sensibilities are an ironic counterbalance to the new, younger generation of Forsytes and the sometimes scandalous and dramatic events in their lives. Many other characters such as George Forsyte's siblings Francie and Eustace, and Nicholas's children Young Nicholas and Euphemia, are also not featured in the television series. Imogen Dartie features briefly in the early television episodes and is not seen again in the later series. Her presence is much greater in the novels.

Writer Jan McVerry explained that there were tough decisions to be made and that many of the secondary characters had to be omitted from the series. "We were concentrating on the strongest stories," she said "We went through the novels and decided which episodes were going into the script and which weren't. You have to do that with any adaptation: you can't represent every incidental character or you'd go on for thousands of hours and bore everyone to death. This is drama and you have to pare it down a bit."

Other differences

The interlude Indian Summer of a Forsyte, which takes place in the summer of 1892, describes the rekindling of Old Jolyon and Irene's relationship (parts of which are featured in Episode Four of the 2002 television series). In the novel Hélène is abroad with Young Jolyon and June at that time and dies in 1894; in the series she has already died.

Bosinney's death is the background of the novel but vividly displayed onscreen. More contact with his Aunt Baines, including a trip to Wales to visit her during his engagement to June, appears in the novels.

Similarly, Soames's rape of Irene in the fourth episode of the series is mentioned in the novels only at the opening of "Voyage into the Inferno", the fourth chapter of The Man of Property: "The morning after a certain night on which Soames last asserted his rights and acted like a man, he breakfasted alone." This event, for present-day readers merely a subtle allusion in Galsworthy's writing, is clearly displayed in the adaptation to television as a major influence on the futures of several chief characters.

In the novels, Jolly and Val meet while both are at Oxford, and it is Young Jolyon's and Holly's visit there that begins Holly's and Val's relationship. In the series, Holly and Val's meeting takes place at Robin Hill just as Jolly has left for the university, and it is combined with Soames's first approach to Jolyon, as Irene's trustee, to find out if there is evidence for him to undertake divorce proceedings.

In the novels, Irene does not visit Robin Hill to tell Young Jolyon of Soames's approaching her to resume their marriage, nor does Soames attempt to approach her in the street while she is assisting "ladies of the night" as depicted in the series; rather, Young Jolyon visits Irene several times and meets Soames in the street when he has been at Irene's flat in Chelsea and his discovery is made there.

The character of Montague Dartie continues into the second To Let series but does not appear in the novels. In the novels, Monty dies in 1913, seven years earlier than the events in To Let.

In the novels, Irene and June resume their friendship prior to Young Jolyon's and Irene's becoming romantically involved. Their reunion is delayed in the televised series until after the birth of the Forsytes' son Jon, at the end of the last episode.

In To Let, Michael Mont meets Soames at June Forsyte's Cork Street Gallery, not at an auction, and just moments before Fleur and Jon first see each other. The broadcast shows Jon and Fleur meeting at the home of June's aunts on Hester's birthday when both are about nine years old, but this is not mentioned in the novel.

The series shows Fleur going incognito to Robin Hill and making the acquaintance of Young Jolyon under a false name, thereby providing an excuse for Young Jolyon to behave angrily toward her later and to provide evidence to his son that she is not to be trusted. This does not occur in the novels.

The copy of Degas's painting of a girl in a hat is not mentioned in the novels. A painting by Goya is mentioned several times, but no painting is described in Irene's and Soames's later meeting in the novels.

In the novel To Let, a letter from his father provides Jon Forsyte the information regarding his mother's past relationship with and final violation by Soames. In the broadcast series, Jon's father reveals this information in speaking to his son face-to-face, together with Irene. The information is not revealed immediately before Young Jolyon's death in the novels (though it comes soon after); and it is Jon, not Irene, who first learns of Young Jolyon's illness.

In the novels, Jon and Fleur do not have a sexual encounter during their initial romance. In a later Galsworthy novel, Swan Song, Fleur wishes she had trapped Jon into marriage by sleeping with him and being "compromised," and later Jon and Fleur do have a one-night stand, while both married to other people, many years after events of To Let take place.

In the novels, Aunt Hester dies in 1907. In the televised series, she is still alive thirteen years later.

The conversation between Soames and Fleur on her wedding day that includes his confession about his grand passion for Irene and his lingering regret at what happened between them does not occur in the novels.

The character of Prosper Profond is rather shadowy in the novels, of lesser importance to events depicted. By contrast, in the broadcast series he is quite prominent, often behaving rather clownishly affecting the lives of several major characters.

At the end of the novels, Jon Forsyte goes to work in British Columbia, rather than in New York as the series suggests. In Galsworthy's writing, his mother Irene joins him; but this is not made clear in the series.

Finally, the handshake between Irene and Soames at Robin Hill, in the last scene of the television series, does not take place in the novel. Instead, Soames refuses Irene's hand at the gallery, not at Robin Hill, and at a later time than the series shows.

Response 
Critical response was positive overall. Maclean's gave the series a glowing review. TIME magazine gave the production a tepid review, calling it "lush, well acted – and stale". People magazine proclaimed it the "Show of the Week," and called Lewis's performance "a constant marvel".

DVD releases

See also 
 The Forsyte Saga (1967 TV series)
 Masterpiece (TV series)

References

Citations

General references

External links 
 The Forsyte Saga, Series I, at PBS (archived)
 The Forsyte Saga, Series II (To Let), at PBS (archived)
 
 
  on Wikidata

2000s British drama television series
2002 British television series debuts
2003 British television series endings
Television series by ITV Studios
ITV television dramas
Television shows produced by Granada Television
Television shows set in Liverpool
English-language television shows
Television shows based on British novels
Period television series
Television series set in the 1870s
Television series set in the 1880s
Television series set in the 1890s
Television series set in the 1900s
Television series set in the 1910s
Television series set in the 1920s
The Forsyte Saga
Television shows shot in Liverpool